Meave G. Leakey (born Meave Epps; 28 July 1942) is a British palaeoanthropologist. She works at Stony Brook University and is co-ordinator of Plio-Pleistocene research at the Turkana Basin Institute. She studies early hominid evolution and has done extensive field research in the Turkana Basin. She has Doctor of Philosophy and Doctor of Science degrees.

Flat-faced man of Kenya
Leakey's research team at Lake Turkana, Kenya made a discovery in 1999. They found a 3.5-million-year-old skull and partial jaw thought to belong to a new branch of the early human family. She named the find Kenyanthropus platyops ("flat-faced man of Kenya").

Personal life 
Leakey was married to Richard Leakey, a palaeontologist. They have two children, Louise (born 1972) and Samira (born 1974). Louise Leakey continues family traditions by conducting palaeontological research.

Leakey initially studied zoology and marine zoology at the University of North Wales. Her first contact with the Leakey family was working for the Tigoni Primate Research Centre while taking her PhD at this time, the centre was being administered by Louis Leakey.

She received her PhD in zoology in 1968. In 2004, she was awarded an honorary D.Sc. from University College, London, for palaeontology. That same year, she received the Golden Plate Award of the American Academy of Achievement. Leakey is currently a Research Professor for the Turkana Basin Institute (affiliated with Stony Brook University). On 30 April 2013, Leakey was elected as a Foreign Associate of the US National Academy of Sciences, with specialities of geology and anthropology. This made Leakey the first Kenyan citizen and also the first woman citizen of an African country to be elected as a member of the National Academy of Sciences. She was elected to the American Philosophical Society in 2017.

Position in the Leakey family

Selected publications

Lothagam: The Dawn of Humanity in Eastern Africa by John Harris and Meave Leakey, Eds. (December 2001).

Stratigraphy and Paleontology of Pliocene and Pleistocene Localities West of Lake Turkana, Kenya by John Harris, Meave Leakey, Eds. et al. (October 1988).

See also 
 Meave (Irish name)
 List of fossil sites (with link directory)
 List of hominina (hominid) fossils (with images)

References

External links
Leakey Foundation
Koobi Fora Research Project
Dr. Meave Leakey Discusses Kenyanthropus platyops
Turkana Basin Institute

1942 births
Living people
20th-century anthropologists
20th-century archaeologists
21st-century anthropologists
21st-century archaeologists
Archaeologists from London
British expatriates in Kenya 
British women anthropologists
British women archaeologists
English anthropologists
Foreign associates of the National Academy of Sciences
Meave
Members of the American Philosophical Society
Paleoanthropologists
Women paleontologists
Fellows of the African Academy of Sciences